Martica Sawin is an author and art critic. She is the author of Surrealism in Exile and the Beginning of the New York School (MIT Press, Cambridge, Massachusetts, 1995) and surveys on artists such as Roberto Matta. Sawin was chairman of the art history department at the Parsons School of Design in New York from 1967 to 1985.

References

External links
Martica Sawin's website
Sawin's interview with Rudy Burckhardt at the Smithsonian's Archives of American Art

American art critics
Parsons School of Design faculty
Year of birth missing (living people)
Living people
American women journalists
American women critics
20th-century American women writers
20th-century American non-fiction writers